Mezen is a town and the administrative center of Mezensky District in Arkhangelsk Oblast, Russia, located on the right bank of the Mezen River close to the point where it flows into the White Sea. Population:

History
The settlement at the location of the present-day Mezen was founded in the 16th century and was known as Okladnikova Sloboda. It was subsequently developed into the trading center of the Mezen River valley where annual trade fairs were held. Besides the trade, the main occupations of the Mezen inhabitants were fishery and seal hunting. In 1780, Okladnikova Sloboda was merged with the nearby settlement of Kuznetsovskaya Sloboda into the town of Mezen. In 1784, Mezen became the seat of Mezensky Uyezd of Vologda Viceroyalty. In 1796, the territory was transferred to Arkhangelsk Governorate. In 1929, several governorates were merged into Northern Krai. On July 15, 1929, the uyezds were abolished and Mezen became the administrative center of Mezensky District.

Administrative and municipal status
Within the framework of administrative divisions, Mezen serves as the administrative center of Mezensky District. As an administrative division, it is, together with the village of Semzha, incorporated within Mezensky District as the town of district significance of Mezen. As a municipal division, the town of district significance of Mezen, together with the territory of Lampozhensky Selsoviet (which comprises four rural localities) in Mezensky District, are incorporated within Mezensky Municipal District as Mezenskoye Urban Settlement.

Restricted access
The northern part of Mezensky District, including Mezen itself, is included into the border security zone, intended to protect the borders of Russia from unwanted activity. In order to visit Mezen, a permit issued by the local Federal Security Service department is required.

Economy

Industry
Economic activity in Mezen is currently limited to food industry and mechanical works. The Mezen sawmill and the Mezen sea harbor are both located in Kamenka across the Mezen River.

Transportation
The Mezen River is navigable; however, there is no passenger navigation in Mezen except for the ferry boat to Kamenka. There is an all-season road to Arkhangelsk (which crosses the Mezen near the village of Kimzha), completed in 2008. During winter, temporary roads (zimniks) are built in snow.

Mezen is served by the Mezen Airport, with several weekly flights to Arkhangelsk.

Culture and recreation
Mezen is one of the few former uyezd towns which generally preserved the historical center. There are many former merchant houses, mostly made of wood, in the town center.

Mezen hosts the Mezen Regional Museum.

A carved epitaph was found in 1957 on a nameless island in the White Sea, done by brothers Ivan and Ondriyan, fishermen from Mezen, who apparently got to the island after the shipwreck and lost any hope to be found again. The epitaph was featured in Laughter and Grief by the White Sea, a 1987 Soviet traditionally animated feature film directed by Leonid Nosyrev made at the Soyuzmultfilm studio.

Climate

Mezen has a subarctic climate (Köppen climate classification Dfc) with long winters and short summers.

References

Notes

Sources

Cities and towns in Arkhangelsk Oblast
Populated places in Mezensky District
Mezensky Uyezd
Populated places of Arctic Russia